Green Eyes is a 1977 American made-for-television war drama film directed by John Erman and written by Eugene Logan and David Seltzer. It is a "touching and moving story" about a Vietnam veteran Lloyd Dubeck (Paul Winfield) who went through a soul searching journey.

The film was produced by Lorimar Productions and broadcast on ABC.

The film won a Peabody Award and a Humanitas Prize in 1977.

Plot 
Lloyd Dubeck (Paul Winfield), is "a Vietnam veteran wounded both physically and psychologically." Released from a VA hospital, walking with a cane, Lloyd can’t find work and can’t seem to fit in. Lloyd's mother (Royce Wallace), has saved up all the money that Lloyd sent her from his Army pay, plus what she earned as a cleaning woman, to enable him go to college and get a degree. Instead, Lloyd decides to return to Saigon to search for a Vietnamese woman, Em Thuy (Victoria Racimo) with whom he fathered a child he has never seen. The only thing he knows about his child, thanks to a single letter from Em Thuy, is that it’s a boy with green eyes".

While in Vietnam, Lloyd meets an orphan named Trung (Lemi) who informs Lloyd that he is his son and that he has been looking for him, pointing out the resemblance in their skin color, but then tricks Lloyd and steals some of his money and his jacket. However, Trung later helps Lloyd in searching for his child by re-connecting him with an old army buddy, Noel Cousins (Jonathan Goldsmith (as Jonathan Lippe)) who has faked his death to desert the Army and is living the good life in Vietnam. Cousins advises Lloyd in the best way to go about searching for Em Thuy.

Lloyd befriends a woman named Margaret Sheen (Rita Tushingham) who runs a "reception center" for orphans who are lucky enough to have been adopted. Margaret informs Lloyd that there's little hope for finding his child, saying that mixed-race children and their mothers are shunned in Vietnamese society, and that eventually many of the children are abandoned and die. She tells Lloyd that his search for his own child is pointless, saying, "If you want a child, reach out. They're all yours, all of them." Going through several orphanages in Saigon and seeing thousands of Vietnam street children, Lloyd devotes his time and the rest of his money to helping the orphaned children, befriending Margaret in the process.

During the search for Em Thuy and his child, Trung accompanies Lloyd, telling the people they meet that Lloyd is his father. Cousins eventually informs Lloyd of the whereabouts of Em Thuy. Trung accompanies Lloyd to the shantytown where she lives, saying he'll wait for him. Lloyd learns that his son with Em Thuy is dead, and Em Thuy has a baby from another American serviceman. Lloyd emerges from Em Thuy's hut to find Trung gone. In despair and out of money, Lloyd decides to return home alone, thinking that Trung can take care of himself. On his way to the airport, however, he realizes his attachment to Trung and goes searching for him. Lloyd finds the boy, who says he saw green eyes when looking in the mirror.

The epilogue says Trung was one of the last orphans allowed to leave Saigon.

Cast
Paul Winfield as Lloyd Dubeck
Rita Tushingham as Margaret Sheen
Jonathan Goldsmith as Noel Cousins
Victoria Racimo as Em Thuy
Lemi as Trung
Royce Wallace as Mrs. Dubeck
Robert DoQui as Hal
Fred Sadoff as VA Officer
Dabbs Greer as Mr. Cousins
Claudia Bryar as Mrs. Cousins
Jester Hairston as Dirk Dubeck
Vernee Watson as Rosalee Dubeck
Buck Young as Policeman

References

External links
 

1977 television films
1977 films
1970s war drama films
ABC network original films
American war drama films
Peabody Award-winning broadcasts
Films directed by John Erman
American drama television films
1970s American films